Windsurfing at the 2011 Island Games was held from 27 June–1 July 2011 at the Yaverland Sailing Club.

Events

Medal table

Medal summary

References
Windsurfing at the 2011 Island Games

2011 Island Games
2011
Sailing competitions in the United Kingdom